Raymond Charles Smith Jr. (6 July 1943 – 6 February 2022) was a United States Navy rear admiral who commanded the Naval Special Warfare Command from 1992 to 1996.

Naval career
Born in San Francisco on 6 July 1943 and raised in Vallejo, California, Smith enlisted in the US Navy in 1962. He was later selected to attend Naval Academy Prep School and subsequently received an appointment to attend the Naval Academy. Smith graduated from the United States Naval Academy in 1967 and subsequently served on  till 1969.

Smith then reported to Basic Underwater Demolition/SEAL training (BUD/S) at Naval Amphibious Base Coronado. After six months of training, Smith graduated with BUD/S class 54 in February 1970. Smith's first assignment was to Underwater Demolition Team TWELVE (UDT-12) and served a combat deployment to South Vietnam. He later went on to receive a Master of Science degree in Physical Oceanography from the Naval Postgraduate School in 1974.

Smith served staff assignments as operations officer and executive officer of UDT 12, followed by an assignment SEAL weapons and diving systems Acquisition Manager in Washington D.C. Smith was assigned as director of SEAL training at Naval Amphibious Base Coronado from 1981 to 1983, then served as executive assistant to the Assistant Secretary of Defense Richard Armitage.

Smith then served as commanding officer of SEAL Delivery Vehicle Team ONE from 1985 to 1987. As a Navy Captain, Smith assumed command of Naval Special Warfare Group ONE (NSWG 1) in August 1989. During Operation Desert Shield and Desert Storm he led all SEAL, Special Boat personnel during completion of hundreds of special operations missions. Smith relinquished command of NSWG 1 in 1991. Between 1992 and 1996 Smith served as the commanding officer of the Naval Special Warfare Command. His final assignment was deputy commanding officer of United States Special Operations Command.  He retired from active duty in 2001 after 34 years of service.

He died at his home in Coronado on 6 February 2022.

Awards and decorations

References

This article contains material from the United States Federal Government and is in the public domain.

External links
 Biography at Premiere Speakers Bureau

1943 births
2022 deaths
People from San Francisco
People from Vallejo, California
United States Naval Academy alumni
United States Navy SEALs personnel
Recipients of the Legion of Merit
United States Navy admirals
Recipients of the Defense Superior Service Medal
Military personnel from California
Burials at Fort Rosecrans National Cemetery